The 1848 Democratic National Convention was a presidential nominating convention that met from Monday May 22 to Friday May 26 in Baltimore, Maryland. It was held to nominate the Democratic Party's candidates for President and Vice president in the 1848 election. The convention selected Senator Lewis Cass of Michigan for President and former Representative William O. Butler of Kentucky for Vice President.

As incumbent Democratic President James K. Polk declined to seek re-election, the Democratic Party nominated a new presidential candidate for the 1848 election. The major competitors for the presidential nomination were Cass, Secretary of State James Buchanan of Pennsylvania, and Supreme Court Justice Levi Woodbury of New Hampshire. Cass led on the first presidential ballot, and he continued to gain delegates until he clinched the nomination on the fourth ballot. Butler won the vice presidential nomination on the second ballot, defeating former Governor John A. Quitman of Mississippi and several other candidates. The Democratic ticket was defeated in the 1848 election by the Whig ticket of Zachary Taylor and Millard Fillmore.

Proceedings 
Former Speaker of the House Andrew Stevenson of Virginia was made the president (chair) of the convention.

After readopting the two-thirds rule for selecting the nominee, the assembly turned to the thorny problem of competing delegations representing different factions of the New York party. The convention adopted a compromise (by a vote of 133 to 118) of splitting the thirty-six votes between the pro-Van Buren faction and the Hunkers that opposed them: despite this, the pro-Van Burenite Barnburners promptly walked out of the convention, while the remaining New York delegates cast blank ballots throughout.

The Democratic National Committee was established at this convention.

Presidential nomination

Presidential candidates

Declined 

The main competitors for the nomination were Senator Lewis Cass of Michigan, Secretary of State James Buchanan from Pennsylvania, and Supreme Court Justice Levi Woodbury from New Hampshire. Former President Martin Van Buren also desired to become the Democratic Party's candidate in the 1848 election. Some party leaders asked William Allen to enter the contest as a compromise candidate, but he refused to run for the presidency. Instead, Allen chose to support Cass over Van Buren due to the two men's mutual support of popular sovereignty.

Van Buren withdrew before balloting began due to a dispute over the seating of the New York delegation that culminated in the convention voting that half of the state's delegates be made up of the anti-slavery "Barnburner" faction, led by Van Buren, with the remaining half from the pro-slavery "Hunker" faction.

Van Buren, knowing he had no feasible path to winning the nomination without the full support of the New York delegation, promptly led the Barnburners in walking out of the convention. Bitter and aging, Van Buren did not care despite the fact that his life had been built upon the rock of party solidarity and party regularity. He loathed Lewis Cass and the principle of popular sovereignty with equal intensity. After it was further ruled the Hunkers would not be allowed to take the vacated seats of their absent Barnburner counterparts, they cast blank ballots during the voting.

On the first ballot, Cass had a large lead with 125 of the 254 delegate votes cast, with Buchanan and Woodbury receiving 55 and 53 votes respectively. On the next two ballots Cass gained a simple majority, while Woodbury's total was steady and Buchanan's began to fall. After Cass received 179 votes out of 254 on the fourth ballot, the chair declared that Cass had reached the required 170 votes and was therefore nominated.

Vice Presidential nomination

Vice Presidential candidates

Declined 

Turning to the choice of a vice presidential running mate, the convention picked General William O. Butler of Kentucky over General John A. Quitman of Mississippi, former Senator and Minister to France William R. King of Alabama, Secretary of the Navy John Y. Mason of Virginia, and Representative James Iver McKay of North Carolina. Before it adjourned on May 25, this convention also appointed the first Democratic National Committee.

See also 
 History of the Democratic Party (United States)
 1848 Whig National Convention
 List of Democratic National Conventions
 U.S. presidential nomination convention
 1848 United States presidential election

References

External links 
 Democratic Party Platform of 1848 at The American Presidency Project
 "Proceedings of The Democratic Convention", The Baltimore Sun, May 23–27, 1848:
 First Day
 Second Day
 Third Day
 Fourth Day
 Fifth Day

1848 conferences
1848 United States presidential election
1848 in Maryland
19th century in Baltimore
Political conventions in Baltimore
Maryland Democratic Party
Political events in Maryland
Democratic National Conventions
May 1848 events